The Turn is the seventh solo studio album by English singer Alison Moyet, released on 15 October 2007 by W14 Music and Universal Music Catalogue. The album includes the singles "One More Time" and "A Guy Like You", as well as three tracks first written and performed in 2006 for stage play Smaller, in which Moyet starred with comedian and longtime friend Dawn French. The Turn was the singer's first release on the W14 Music label and debuted at  21 on the UK Albums Chart on 22 October 2007, spending four weeks in the chart.

A deluxe edition of The Turn was released by Cooking Vinyl on 2 October 2015.

Background
After the release and promotion of the 2004 covers album Voice, Moyet began rehearsals to play a leading role in the stage play Smaller, alongside Dawn French. The play, written by Carmel Morgan and directed by Kathy Burke, was toured across the UK for six weeks before opening at West End's Lyric Theatre in April 2006. In addition to her role in the play, Moyet wrote three songs for the play; "World Without End", "Home" and "Smaller".

Following Smaller, Moyet began writing new material with her songwriting partner Pete Glenister before returning to the studio to record The Turn, which included the three songs penned for Smaller. The album was released in October 2007 and reached No. 21 on the UK Albums Chart. Two singles were released from the album; "One More Time" (No. 151 on the UK Singles Chart) and "A Guy Like You".

Speaking to Female First in 2007, Moyet said of the album: "The Turn is an album of crafted song. We started building it from a core of Chansons, the shapes of Roy Orbison that grow from a gentle place to an impassioned climax. It is about melody and intelligent lyrics. We let it fray outwards from there. It is in turn progressive and reflective." She told PopMatters in 2008: "One of the things I wanted to do with The Turn was write a production of songs that could be stripped down to one or two instruments if you chose to do it."

Critical reception

Upon release, Chris Long, writing for the BBC Music, commented: "The Turn is no blistering return to form to sit proudly alongside the real gems of her career, but it is satisfying nonetheless, and it's a welcome reminder that Moyet still has one of the most emotive and intoxicating British voices ever." Cheryl Arrighie of 33rpm.com described the album as a "strong collection of songs" and a "marked improvement" over Voice, but was critical of the inclusion of the three songs from Smaller. She added: "You can't help feeling that it's all been done and heard before." IndieLondon felt the album was an "acquired taste", with a diversity that "creates an uneven experience". They concluded: "The Turn most obvious asset is its voice – but given that it's the first album of new material from Moyet in five years it fails to generate the levels of excitement we'd been anticipating."

John Murphy of musicOMH felt the album "certainly delivers substance", with "several of the tracks deserv[ing] special mention". He concluded: "Quite possibly the red wine album of the year so far." Richie Unterberger of AllMusic felt the material on The Turn "mixes orchestrated pop/rock with a blue-eyed soul sensibility" and considered it "adult contemporary pop that's far above the usual standards for that genre". Chuck Taylor of Billboard wrote: "The Turn proffers all sides of the smoky, blues-soaked singer/songwriter's persona." In a review of the 2015 deluxe edition, Paul Scott-Bates of Louder Than War noted the album's "incredible depth of material" and Moyet's "superb performances".

Track listing

Personnel

Musicians

 Alison Moyet – lead vocals (all tracks)
 London Session Orchestra (LSO) – performer (tracks 1-3, 7-8)
 David Daniels – cello (LSO) (tracks 1-3, 7-8)
 Bruce White – viola (LSO) (tracks 1-3, 7-8)
 Warren Zielinski – viola (LSO) (tracks 1-2, 7), violin (tracks 3, 8)
 Boguslan Kostecki, Patrick Kiernan – violin (LSO) (tracks 1-3, 7-8)
 Perry Montague-Mason – violin and leader (LSO) (tracks 1-3, 7-8)
 Simon Hale – conductor (LSO), arrangement and direction (tracks 1-3, 7-8)
 Pete Glenister – guitar (tracks 1-7, 9-11), keyboards (tracks 1-2, 4, 7), piano (tracks 3, 8), bass (tracks 4-5, 10), organ (track 6)
 Malcolm Moore – bass (tracks 1, 6-7)
 David Ballard – drums (track 1)
 Adam Mooney, Gabi Glenister – saxophone (track 2)
 Julian Cox – bass (tracks 2, 9)
 Bob Knight – drums (tracks 2, 4, 6, 9)
 Mary Scully – double bass (LSO) (tracks 3, 8)
 Anthony Pleeth – cello (LSO) (tracks 3, 8)
 George F. Robertson, Peter Lale – viola (LSO) (tracks 3, 8)
 Chris Tombling, Emlyn Singleton, Everton Nelson, Julian Leaper, Rita Manning, Tom Piggot-Smith – violin (LSO) (tracks 3, 8)
 Bob Andrews – Hammond organ (track 5)
 Karl Brazil – drums (tracks 5, 7)
 Jo Wilcox – oboe (track 6)
 Marcos D'Cruze – Spanish guitar (track 9)
 Marcel Azzola – accordion (track 9)
 Nick Lloyd – flugelhorn, trombone, euphonium (track 10)

Technical
 Pete Glenister – producer (all tracks), programming (tracks 1-7, 11), engineer (all tracks), mixing (tracks 1, 3, 5-8, 10-11)
 Stephen Price – strings engineer (tracks 3, 8)
 Louis Skinner – programming (track 4)
 Phil Da Costa – programming (track 5), engineer (all tracks), mixing (tracks 1, 3, 6, 8, 10-11)
 Glen Skinner – mixing (tracks 2, 4-5, 9)
 Phil Bodger – mixing (track 7)
 Dick Beetham – mastering
 John Williams – executive producer

Artwork
 Alison Cahill – sleeve design
 Sam Jones – photography

Charts

References

2007 albums
Alison Moyet albums